Abdul Rahman bin Abbas (born 15 April 1938) is a Malaysian politician who served as the 7th Yang di-Pertua Negeri of Penang from 1 May 2001 to 30 April 2021. He is a former politician from the United Malays National Organisation (UMNO). Abdul Rahman was appointed to the governorship by the King in May 2001 and was reappointed six times, in 2005, 2009, 2011, 2013, 2015, and 2017.

Early life
Tun Abdul Rahman studied at Permatang Sintok Malay School in Kepala Batas and Sultan Idris Teachers College in Tanjung Malim before attending a teaching course at the Language Institute, Kuala Lumpur. He obtained his Bachelor of Arts from the University of Malaya in 1973. After graduating, Abdul Rahman became a teacher.

Political career
Abdul Rahman joined UMNO after ending his career in teaching. He was an exco member of the party's Youth wing (1975–1979) and held the position of Kepala Batas division treasurer from 1995 to his appointment as governor.

In 1977, Abdul Rahman was elected to the Penang State Assembly in a by-election following the death of Ahmad Badawi Haji Abdullah, the father of former prime minister Abdullah Ahmad Badawi. During the four terms he served, Abdul Rahman was also a member of the state executive council under Chief Minister Lim Chong Eu. In his final term, he was elected Speaker of the State Assembly.

Yang di-Pertua Negeri
Abdul Rahman was appointed Yang di-Pertua Negeri of Penang by Yang di-Pertuan Agong Tuanku Salahuddin Abdul Aziz Shah in May 2001 for four years. In 2005, his term was extended for another four years by Tuanku Syed Sirajuddin. He was reappointed by Tuanku Mizan Zainal Abidin in 2009 and 2011, by Tuanku Abdul Halim Mu’adzam Shah in 2013 and 2015, and by Tuanku Muhammad V in 2017 for another four years.

Honours & titles of Abdul Rahman Abbas 
He has been awarded :

Titles 
He holds currently the title of "Tun Dato' Seri Utama" by combination of his highest Federal Malaysian title "Tun" (SMN) and his highest Penang title "Dato' Seri Utama" (DUPN).
In other states of Malaysia, a similar combination between his highest Federal Malaysian title "Tun" (SMN) and his local highest title may be used. Example : Tun Datuk Seri Panglima in Sabah.

Honours of Penang 
 As 7th Yang di-Pertua Negeri of Penang (since 1 May 2001)
 Order of the Defender of State :
  Member (DJN)
  Companion (DMPN) with title Dato’
  Knight Grand Commander (DUPN) with title Dato’ Seri Utama
  Grand Master

Honours of Malaysia 
  :
  Grand Commander of the Order of the Defender of the Realm  (SMN)  with title Tun
  :
 Grand Knight of the Order of the Territorial Crown (SUMW) with title Datuk Seri Utama (2021)
  :
  Member of the Supreme Order of Sri Mahawangsa (DMK) 
  :
  Grand Commander of the Order of Kinabalu (SPDK) with title Datuk Seri Panglima
  :
  Knight Grand Commander (Datuk Patinggi) of the Order of the Star of Hornbill Sarawak (DP) with title Datuk Patinggi

Honours & titles of Majimor binti Shariff 
Yang Amat Berbahagia Toh Puan Dato' Seri Utama Hajah Majimor binti Shariff has been awarded :

Titles 
She holds currently the title of "Toh Puan Dato' Seri Utama" by combination of the female form "Toh Puan" connected to her husband's highest Federal Malaysian title "Tun" (SMN) and her highest Penang title "Dato' Seri Utama" (DUPN)

Honours of Penang  
 As wife of the 7th Yang di-Pertua Negeri of Penang (since 1 May 2001) :
  Knight Grand Commander of the Order of the Defender of State (DUPN) with title Dato’ Seri Utama

References

Citations

Sources 

 

1938 births
Living people
Malaysian people of Malay descent
Malaysian Muslims
People from Penang
United Malays National Organisation politicians
Members of the Penang State Legislative Assembly
Penang state executive councillors
Speakers of the Penang State Legislative Assembly
Yang di-Pertua Negeri of Penang
University of Malaya alumni

Grand Commanders of the Order of the Defender of the Realm
Members of the Supreme Order of Sri Mahawangsa
Grand Commanders of the Order of Kinabalu
Knights Grand Commander of the Order of the Star of Hornbill Sarawak